Luke Easter is an American singer and songwriter.  Before becoming a solo artist, he was the lead singer of the Christian metal band Tourniquet.

History
Easter had been a part of a band called Heaven's Gate, prior to the cult's formation. Easter joined Tourniquet during their 1992 Pathogenic Ocular Dissonance tour, replacing former vocalist Guy Ritter. According to Easter, Bryan Gray (The Blamed, Rocks in Pink Cement) was the reason for his induction, directing him to bassist Victor Macias. With his addition, the band changed musical direction with the first album to feature Easter, Vanishing Lessons. With Easter on Vocals, the band shifted, with the lineup consisting of Easter, drummer Ted Kirkpatrick, guitarist Aaron Guerra, bassist Victor Macias, and guitarist Gary Lenaire. In 1997, the band released Crawl to China, however, this was without Macias and Lenaire, as the two quit the band due to differences with Kirkpatrick. Lenaire and Easter's relationship was also rough by the time of Lenaire's departure. Easter recorded with the band on their 2012 release, Antiseptic Bloodbath, marking Tourniquet's 7th album and Easter' fifth. He would also contribute on their 2014 release, Onward to Freedom, which was under the name of The Tourniquet Ark. He continued as the lead singer of the band until 2015. In December 2015, the band announced that Easter had left the band due to shifts in musical direction. Kirkpatrick stated that Easter's departure had to do with his musical path not aligning with the band's.

In 2018, Easter released a crowdfunded EP, The Pop Disaster. In a change of direction from the progressive metal of Tourniquet, the new EP featured pop-influenced rock. The EP featured performances by Tim Gaines (ex-Stryper), David Bach (Guardian) on bass, Josiah Prince (Disciple) on lead guitars, Jesse Sprinkle (ex-Poor Old Lu, ex-Demon Hunter) on drums, and Kris Kanoho on guitars. In 2020, it was announced by Gary Lenaire that Easter, Guy Ritter, and original Tourniquet guitarist Erik Mendez would perform on Lenaire's newest solo album, alongside David Husvik (Extol, Azusa) on drums. Lenaire, Easter, Ritter, Mendez, and Husvik are also hoping to reach out to former bassist Victor Macias (ex-Tourniquet, ex-Deliverance, 2050) to perform on the release as well.

Discography 

Solo
The Pop Disaster (EP) (2018)

Tourniquet
 Vanishing Lessons (1994)
 Carry the Wounded (EP) (1995)
 The Collected Works of Tourniquet (1996)
 Crawl to China (1997)
 Acoustic Archives (1998)
 Microscopic View of a Telescopic Realm (2000)
 Where Moth and Rust Destroy (2003)
 Live in California - 1998 (2010)
 Antiseptic Bloodbath (2012)
 Onward to Freedom (2014; as The Tourniquet Ark)

Videography 
 Pushin' Broom Video (1995) - VHS
 Tourniquet Live in California (1998) - VHS
 Ocular Digital (2003) - DVD
 Till Sverige Med Kärlek (To Sweden With Love) (2006) - DVD

References

External links
 

American male singers
American heavy metal singers
American performers of Christian music
Christian metal musicians
Living people
Year of birth missing (living people)